Michael Getler (November 13, 1935 – March 15, 2018) was an American journalist.

Biography
Getler was ombudsman for the Public Broadcasting Service in the United States.

He was the first holder of this post, and the first ombudsman to be appointed at any of the major American television networks. His previous posts included ombudsman at the Washington Post from 2000 to 2005 and executive editor at the International Herald Tribune from 1996 to 2000. Prior to those positions, he was a reporter (covering defense and military affairs), foreign correspondent, foreign editor, assistant managing editor and deputy managing editor for the Washington Post from 1970 to 1996.

According to the Family Jewels documents, he was under surveillance by the CIA in 1971 for having "run a story which was an obvious intelligence leak".

Prior to the start of his journalism career, Getler was a United States naval aviator.

Getler died of bile duct cancer in Washington, D.C., at the age of 82.

References

External links
 PBS biography
 

1935 births
2018 deaths
American male journalists
Journalists from New York City
Deaths from cancer in Washington, D.C.
20th-century American journalists
Deaths from cholangiocarcinoma
The Washington Post journalists
PBS people
International Herald Tribune people
Writers from the Bronx
Military personnel from New York City
United States Naval Aviators